Lieutenant-Colonel John Kyme Cordeaux  (23 July 1902 – 4 January 1982), was a Conservative Party politician in the United Kingdom.

Cordeaux was elected at the 1955 general election as Member of Parliament for Nottingham Central, narrowly defeating the Labour MP Ian Winterbottom.

Background and military career
Cordeaux was born into a gentry family descended from Edward I, the second son of Colonel Edward Kyme Cordeaux (1866-1948), CBE, DL, JP, of Brackenborough Lawn, Louth, Lincolnshire, High Sheriff of Lincolnshire in 1925, late of the Lincolnshire Regiment, and Hilda Eliza Agar, MBE, daughter of Sir Henry Bennett, of Grimsby and of Thorpe Hall, Louth. His paternal grandfather was the ornithologist John Cordeaux.

Cordeaux served in World War II in the Royal Marines, reaching the rank of Lieutenant Colonel.

Political career
He held the seat in 1959, but lost it at the 1964 election to the Labour candidate Jack Dunnett.

Honours
Cordeaux was appointed CBE in 1946, and was a Commander of the Order of Orange-Nassau (with swords), Commander of the Order of the Dannebrog, and received the King Haakon VII Freedom Cross.

Personal life
In 1923, Cordeaux married Norah, daughter of A. L. Hilyar Cleland; they divorced in 1953 having had three sons and a daughter.

References 

Richard Kimber's Political Science Resources: UK General Elections since 1832

External links 
 

1902 births
1982 deaths
Conservative Party (UK) MPs for English constituencies
UK MPs 1955–1959
UK MPs 1959–1964